Lieutenant-General Anatoly Ivanovich Yakunin (Анатолий Иванович Якунин; born February 11, 1964) is a Russian policeman who was Moscow Police Commissioner (June 2012-September 2016). previously, he was the Chief of Police in Novgorod Oblast (2008-2012).

Biography
Anatoly Yakunin was born on February 11, 1964, in Krivtsovo-Plota village in Dolzhan region in Oryol Oblast, Russian SFSR, Soviet Union.

Anatoly Yakunin has a law degree. He graduated from the Academy of Interior Ministry of Russia, and then the Academy of Public Administration under the President of Russia.

His Service in the Soviet Police begun in Dolzhan Region Police Department as local inspector in the police station.

For more than 20 years of service in the police, consistently and with dignity he rose from an ordinary police officer to the head of Police departments in the regional level.

He held the post of Head of the Chief Directorate for Combating Organized Crime and the Chief of Criminal Police Department of the Oryol Oblast. Then he served as first deputy chief and the Chief of Criminal Police Department in the Voronezh Oblast.

From April 2011 to May 2012 he served as the Chief of Police in Novgorod Oblast, in his first office as Chief of Police.

On June 2, 2012, the Russian President, Vladimir Putin signed a decree on the appointment of Major-General Anatoly Ivanovich Yakunin, as the Chief of the Moscow Police (Officially, Head of MVD Directorate in Moscow).

In April 2020, Anatoly was appointed Deputy Director of the Federal Correctional Service.

Honors and awards
He was awarded the state award:
 Medal "For Distinction in the Protection of Public Order"
 The badge "Honorary Worker of the Interior Ministry"

External links 
 Official Biography from the Moscow City Police Website
 Yakunin Anatoly visit card from MVD official website (in Russian)

References

1964 births
People from Oryol Oblast
Commissioners of the Moscow City Police
Living people
Russian municipal police chiefs